Fábio Henrique Matias (born 25 September 1979) is a Brazilian football manager, currently in charge of Red Bull Bragantino's under-20 squad, and their reserve team Red Bull Brasil.

Career
Matias was born in Santa Bárbara d'Oeste, São Paulo, and was a goalkeeper at União Barbarense's youth setup. He never played as a senior, and subsequently started his managerial career in 2000, as a goalkeeping and fitness coach for Rio Branco-SP's under-15 side.

Matias' first managerial experience occurred with his Guarani, being in charge of the under-17 squad. In 2011, he joined Desportivo Brasil to become their under-17 manager, and won the 2012 U17 Campeonato Paulista with the side.

Matias moved to Grêmio in 2014, again as an under-17 manager. On 20 February 2016, he signed for cross-town rivals Internacional under the same role, and was appointed in charge of the latter's under-20s the following year.

Matias left Inter on 23 February 2018, and took over Figuerense's under-20s roughly one month later. On 25 March 2019, he moved back to Internacional, again as manager of the under-20s. With the latter, he won the 2020 Copa São Paulo de Futebol Júnior.

On 26 February 2021, after the departure of Abel Braga, Matias was named interim manager of the first team for the first rounds of the 2021 Campeonato Gaúcho. His first match in charge occurred on 1 March, a 1–0 win over Juventude.

Matias subsequently returned to his previous role with the under-20s after Miguel Ángel Ramírez took over the main squad. On 21 July 2021, he was named manager of Flamengo's under-20 side.

Honours
Internacional U20
Copa São Paulo de Futebol Júnior: 2020

References

External links

1979 births
Living people
People from Santa Bárbara d'Oeste
Brazilian football managers
Sport Club Internacional managers
Red Bull Brasil managers
Footballers from São Paulo (state)